The Ahar are a Hindu caste in India. The term "Ahar" was historically associated with the Yadav caste, along with the term "Ahir". At the start of the 20th century, the group labelled Ahar were generally found in a few west-central districts of India, but in the 1931 census of India appeared in large numbers recorded in the north-central districts, though not in any of the districts between the former and latter. They claim to be descended from Yadu Race.

Ahar, also called Ahir or Yadav is a peasant or agricultural caste of North India. 

The Yadava Movement in nineteenth century has successfully attempted to merge the regional caste identities like Ahar, Ahir, Gwala, Gop and so on, in favour of a generic term Yadava. According to 1931 census, the population of Ahar, Ahir, Gop, Ghoshi, Gwalvanshi, like pastoral communities was 14,170,032. Lord Krishna himself belonged to the tribe of the Yadavas, or descendants of Yadu.

References

 ;
Ahir